Dendrobium jenkinsii, the Jenkins's dendrobium, is a species of orchid. It is native to southern China (Yunnan), the eastern Himalayas (Bhutan, Assam) and northern Indochina (Vietnam, Thailand, Laos, Myanmar).

References

External links

jenkinsii
Flora of East Himalaya
Flora of Indo-China
Orchids of Assam
Orchids of Yunnan
Plants described in 1839